Geritola subargentea, the silvery epitola, is a butterfly in the family Lycaenidae. It is found in Ivory Coast, Cameroon, the Central African Republic, the Democratic Republic of the Congo, Uganda and Tanzania. Its habitat is the forest.

Subspecies
Geritola subargentea subargentea (Democratic Republic of the Congo, Uganda, north-western Tanzania)
Geritola subargentea continua Libert, 1999 (western Ivory Coast, Cameroon, Central African Republic)

References

Butterflies described in 1964
Poritiinae